French-Serbian relations are foreign relations between France and Serbia. Both countries established diplomatic relations on January 18, 1879, between the French Third Republic and the Kingdom of Serbia. Both countries are members of the United Nations, the Council of Europe, the Partnership for Peace, and the Organization for Security and Co-operation in Europe (OSCE). After a short period of severance caused by the 1999 NATO bombing of Yugoslavia, France's diplomatic relations with Serbia (then the Federal Republic of Yugoslavia) were restored on 16 November 2000. Since 2006, Serbia is an observer on the Francophonie.
France is also an EU member and Serbia is an EU candidate.
There are between 70,000 and 100,000 people of Serbian descent living in France.

The last official visit of the French President to Serbia took place in July 2019, when the head of the French state, Emmanuel Macron, went to Serbia.

History 
Serbia and France have a history of close relations. Those were seriously shaken with France's participation in the 1999 NATO bombing of Yugoslavia, and Kosovo war, but have been improving since 2000.

The oldest documented possible contact between the two sides was the marriage of Stephen Uroš I of Serbia and Helen of Anjou. The first important contacts of French and Serbs came only in the 19th century when French travel writers first wrote about this Balkan country. In the 19th century, Karađorđe Petrović, leader of Serbian Revolution, sent a letter to Napoleon expressing his admiration, while in the French parliament, Victor Hugo made a speech asking France to assist Serbia and to protect the Serbian population from Ottoman crimes. Rapid development of bilateral relations followed, so that the people in Serbia saw a great new friend in "mighty France", that could protect them from the Ottomans and Habsburgs. Relations between Serbia and France continued to improve until the First World War, when the "common struggle" against a common enemy reached its peak. Before the war France won the  sympathy of the Serbian population by building railways, opening French Schools, a Consulate and a French Bank. Several Serbian kings from this period studied at universities in Paris, as well as large part of the future diplomats. Serbs gained a sense of Francophile because all these activities moved them away from the Ottoman and Habsburg empires. The Serbian-French alliance until 1914 even threatened the traditional inclination towards Russia. Great humanitarian and military assistance was sent by France to Serbia during the First World War, including assistance in the evacuation of children, civilians and military at the end of the war, and the support of French newspaper headlines. In the interwar period, rivaling German political influence became less relevant, and France became the primary influence in Kingdom of Yugoslavia and French culture was favored by Serb elites.

The members of four generations of the national elite known as 'Parisians' played an important role in the political life of modern Serbia. Liberals, Progressives, Radicals and Independent Radicals pursued and shaped modern political principles and values in 19th century Serbia. Implementing and creatively adapting French models and doctrines, and the 'Parisians' contributed to the democratization and Europeanization of Serbia and the eminent place the French influence had in her politics and culture before the WWI. Also, a number of notable Serb painters were educated and worked in France, mostly Paris. French was the second language in schools during the whole interwar period, and it was studied as the second language in Kingdom of Serbia.

French influence was visible in the literary production which drew on French models. This influence was explained with “strong spiritual similarity between the French and Serbian mentalities and the French and Serbian languages" and it had a fundamental role in creation of the "Belgrade style".

Some French travelers wrote that “Serbia is the most Francophile country in the world”.

Even today, actions and alliance from the WWI remain deeply ingrained in the collective consciousness of a large number of Serbs. In 1964 Socialist Federal Republic of Yugoslavia and France signed 6 year bilateral trade agreement which provided Yugoslavia with the same trading conditions France was providing for the OECD member countries contributing to further development of Yugoslav relations with the European Economic Community.

Kosovo 
When Kosovo declared its independence from Serbia on 17 February 2008, France became one of the first countries to recognize its independence. A WikiLeaks report suggested that France had made it clear that Serbia could not enter the EU without recognizing Kosovo's independence. France participated in the 1999 NATO bombing of Yugoslavia, which resulted in a UN administration of Kosovo and then to eventual independence in which Serbia does not recognise. France currently has 1,368 troops serving in Kosovo as peacekeepers in the NATO led Kosovo Force. Originally there was 7,000 French troops in KFOR.

Cooperation 
With the signing of the Agreement on the Succession of Interstate Treaties on 26 March 2003, the procedure of consolidation of the treaty status between the two countries has been completed. Among the treaties, the most important ones are: the Agreement for the Protection of Investments (1974); the Agreement on the Avoidance of Double Taxation (1974); the Convention on Social Security (1950); the Agreement on Cultural Cooperation (1964); the Agreement on Road Transport (1964). In 2005, the volume of trade between the two countries was US$453,827 million. Serbian and French Presidents Boris Tadić and Nicolas Sarkozy signed in Paris at April 2011 a political declaration meant to support Serbia's EU integration.

Resident diplomatic missions
 France has an embassy in Belgrade.
 Serbia has an embassy in Paris with a consulate-general in Strasbourg.

See also 
 Serbian Embassy, Paris
 Banque franco-serbe
 Serbs in France 
 Accession of Serbia to the European Union
 France–Yugoslavia relations

Notes

References

External links 
  French Ministry of Foreign Affairs about relations with Serbia 
  French embassy in Belgrade (in French and Serbian only)
  Serbian Ministry of Foreign Affairs about relations with France
  Serbian embassy in Paris(in French and Serbian only)
 Serbs in France NGO
  French-Serbian friendship site (in French and Serbian only)
  Serbian Orthodox Church in France (in French and Serbian only)
  Serbian-French association (in French and Serbian only)
  Serbian-French cultural and sports association (in French and Serbian only)

Sources

 
Serbia
Bilateral relations of Serbia